The 1962 Gent–Wevelgem was the 24th edition of the Gent–Wevelgem cycle race and was held on 25 March 1962. The race started in Ghent and finished in Wevelgem. The race was won by Rik Van Looy of the Flandria team.

General classification

References

Gent–Wevelgem
1962 in road cycling
1962 in Belgian sport
March 1962 sports events in Europe